Gabriella Tóth (born 17 January 1988), also known as Gabi Tóth and Gabriella Krausz-Tóth, is a Hungarian singer. She has been an X-Faktor mentor since 2013. Her sister, Vera Tóth, is also a Hungarian singer, who won the first season of Megasztár.

Life 
Tóth began her career in the Autumn of 2004 the second season of Megasztár, where she placed third and also achieved the best female artist prize for 2005. Her debut album Fekete virág was released in 2005. Two of the songs, the titular Fekete virág  and Vágyom rád had music videos. The album was released in concert in 2006 at Müpa Budapest with a live orchestral accompaniment and an opening with TNT in the evening. A single, Szívemet adnám, was released in 2007, along with a video clip. Later that year, she starred in the VIVA Hungary
reality show A Stáb, along with Tamás Molnár and Linda Zimány, which became the most watched show of VIVA Hungary.

In 2008, Tóth became one of the faces of the Tiszta Fejjel Projekt. Her songs have been featured on their video clips. She has worked with composer Tibor Kasza on her second full album, which was released in 2009. Tóth numbers begin to pick up and completed by the latest clip to the song Salalla. The following year, it appeared on her second studio album Elég volt!. In 2010, she was a guest performer on X-Faktor and recorded the theme for the reality TV show Való Világ for its fourth series. The song was so successful that it was also used in the fifth, sixth and seventh seasons.

In 2012, Tóth participated in A Dal, the national selection process for Hungary in the Eurovision Song Contest for that year where the audience and the professional jury chose who would represent Hungary at the 2012 Eurovision Song Contest. She participated with the song Nem Kell Végszó and came in a tied 5th place overall. The song came into 4th place on the MAHASZ song charts. In 2013, she became a mentor on the X-Faktor along with Péter Geszti, Róbert Szikora, and Róbert Alföldi. In 2014, she returned to the series, along with Geszti, Szikora, Alföldi, and new judge Little G Weevil (Gábor Szűcs). In 2015, she moved on to participate in the RTL Klub and TV2 based show Sztárban sztár. She finished third overall. She returned to X-Faktor to mentor alongside Gáspár Laci, Péter Puskás, and ByeAlex.

In 2016, it was announced that Tóth would participate again in A Dal, this time in the 2017 edition with the song Hosszú idők, along with Freddie Shuman and Begi Lotfi. She progressed to the finals.

Discography

Albums

Video clips 
 2005 – Fekete Virág 
 2006 – Vágyom rád 
 2007 – Szívemet adnám
 2007 – Élünk ahogy bárki (A Stáb)
 2008 – Érte megérte
 2008 – Kell még valami (A Stáb)
 2009 – Tiszta fejjel (Tiszta Fejjel Projekt)
 2009 – Valami Amerika Még feat. Csipa
 2009 – Salalla
 2009 – Mi a szívemen, a számon vs. AFC Tomi 
 2010 – Elég volt!
 2011 – Jöjj még
 2012 – Nem kell végszó
 2012 – Hív az élet
 2013 – Éjjel-nappal Budapest
 2013 – Sors
 2016 – Ez vagyok én
 2016 – Hosszú idők

Honors and awards 

2006 – Fonogram díj - Az év hazai felfedezettje (jelölés)
 2008 – VIVA Comet - Legjobb videoklip (Stáb-Élünk, ahogy bárki) (jelölés)
 2009 – Fonogram díj - Az év hazai dala (Szívemet adnám) (jelölés)
 2009 – Glamour Women of the Year - Az év énekesnője (jelölés)
 2009 – VIVA Comet - Legjobb női előadó (jelölés)
 2009 – BRAVO OTTO - A legjobb magyar női előadó (jelölés)
 2009 – BRAVO OTTO - Cool TV Különdíj (díjazott)
 2010 – Glamour Women of the Year - Az év énekesnője (jelölés)
 2010 – BRAVO OTTO - Az év magyar női előadója (díjazott)
 2010 – BRAVO OTTO - Az év magyar videoklipje (Mi a szívemen, a számon) (jelölés)
 2011 – Glamour Women of the Year - Az év énekesnője (díjazott)
 2011 – BRAVO OTTO -Az év magyar női előadója (jelölés)
 2011– BRAVO OTTO -Az év magyar videoklipje (Elég volt!) (jelölés)
 2011 – VIVA Comet - Legjobb női előadó (jelölés)
 2011 – VIVA Comet -Legjobb videoklip (Elég volt!) (díjazott)
 2012 – Story Ötcsillag-díj - Az év legjobb énekese (díjazott)
 2012 – BRAVO OTTO - Az év legjobb női előadója (díjazott)
 2012 – VIVA Comet - Legjobb női előadó (díjazott)
 2013 – BRAVO OTTO - Az év magyar női előadója (jelölés)
 2014 – BRAVO OTTO - Az év magyar női előadója (jelölés)
 2014 – VIVA Comet - Legjobb női előadó (jelölés)
 2016 – Comet - Legjobb női előadó (jelölés)
 2016 – Comet - Legjobb dal (Ez vagyok én) (jelölés)

Personal life 
Her partner is Hungarian chef Gábor Krausz. Since they got married in 2020, Gabi's changed her surname to Krausz-Tóth. On 3rd of  December 2019 was born their first daughter, named Hannaróza Mária Krausz.

See also
 Megasztár
 Vera Tóth

References

External links
 Tóth Gabi hivatalos oldala
 Mahasz.hu
 Tóth Gabi - Érte megérte videó

1988 births
21st-century Hungarian women singers
People from Tapolca
Living people